The General Electric GAU-8/A Avenger is a 30 mm hydraulically driven seven-barrel Gatling-style autocannon that is primarily mounted in the United States Air Force's Fairchild Republic A-10 Thunderbolt II. Designed to destroy a wide variety of ground targets, the Avenger delivers very powerful rounds at a high rate of fire. The GAU-8/A is also used in the Goalkeeper CIWS ship weapon system, which provides defense against short-range threats such as highly maneuverable missiles, aircraft, and fast maneuvering surface vessels. The GAU-8/A is currently produced by General Dynamics.

History
The GAU-8 was created as a parallel program with the A-X (or Attack Experimental) competition that produced the A-10. The specification for the cannon was laid out in 1970, with General Electric and Philco-Ford offering competing designs. Both of the A-X prototypes, the YA-10 and the Northrop YA-9, were designed to incorporate the weapon, although it was not available during the initial competition; the M61 Vulcan was used as a temporary replacement. Once completed, the entire GAU-8 assembly (correctly referred to as the A/A 49E-6 Gun System) represents about 16% of the A-10 aircraft's unladen weight. Because the gun plays a significant role in maintaining the A-10's balance and center of gravity, a jack must be installed beneath the airplane's tail whenever the gun is removed for inspection in order to prevent the aircraft from tipping rearwards.

The gun is mounted slightly to the port side with the active firing cannon barrel on the starboard side at the 9 o'clock position and on the aircraft's center line. The front landing gear is positioned to the starboard side. The gun is loaded using Syn-Tech's linked tube carrier GFU-8/E 30 mm Ammunition Loading Assembly cart. This vehicle is unique to the A-10 and the GAU-8.

The A-10 with its GAU-8/A gun entered service in 1977. It was produced by General Electric, though General Dynamics Armament and Technical Products has been responsible for production and support since 1997 when the division was sold by Lockheed Martin to General Dynamics.

Design
The GAU-8 itself weighs , but the complete weapon, with feed system and drum, weighs  with a maximum ammunition load. Power for operating the gun is provided by twin hydraulic motors pressurized from two independent hydraulic systems. The magazine can hold 1,174 rounds, although 1,150 is the typical load-out. Muzzle velocity when firing armor-piercing incendiary rounds is 1,013 m/s, almost the same as the substantially lighter M61 Vulcan's 20 mm round, giving the gun a muzzle energy of just over 200 kilojoules.

The standard ammunition mixture for anti-armor use is a five-to-one mix of PGU-14/B Armor Piercing Incendiary, with a projectile weight of about 14.0 oz (395 grams or 6,096 grains) and PGU-13/B High Explosive Incendiary (HEI) rounds, with a projectile weight of about 13.3 oz (378 grams or 5,833 grains). The PGU-14/B's projectile incorporates a lightweight aluminum body, cast around a smaller caliber depleted uranium penetrating core. In 1979, the Avenger was tested against M47 Patton tanks and caused "severe damage".

An innovation in the design of the GAU-8/A ammunition is the use of aluminum alloy cases in place of the traditional steel or brass. This alone adds 30% to ammunition capacity for a given weight. The projectiles incorporate a plastic driving band to improve barrel life. The cartridges measure  in length and weigh  or more.

The Avenger's rate of fire was originally selectable, 2,100 rounds per minute (rpm) in the low setting, or 4,200 rpm in the high setting. This rate was later changed to a fixed rate of 3,900 rpm. At this speed it would take 18 seconds of sustained fire to empty the magazine. In practice, the cannon is limited to one and two-second bursts to avoid overheating and conserve ammunition; barrel life is also a factor, since the USAF has specified a minimum life of at least 20,000 rounds for each set of barrels. There is no technical limitation on the duration the gun may be continuously fired, and a pilot could potentially expend the entire ammunition load in a single burst with no damage or ill effects to the weapons system itself. However, this constant rate of fire would shorten the barrel life considerably and require added barrel inspections and result in shorter intervals between replacement.

Each barrel is a very simple non-automatic design having its own breech and bolt. Like the original Gatling gun, the entire firing cycle is actuated by cams and powered by the rotation of the barrels. The seven-barrel carriage assembly itself is driven by the aircraft's dual hydraulic system.

The GAU-8/A ammunition feed is linkless, reducing weight and avoiding a great deal of potential for jamming. The feed system is double-ended, allowing the spent casings to be returned to the ammunition drum. Additionally, returning empty cases to the drum has less effect on the aircraft's center of gravity than ejecting them. The feed system is based on that developed for later M61 installations, but uses more advanced design techniques and materials throughout, to save weight.

Firing system

Accuracy
The GAU-8/A is extremely accurate and can fire up to 3,900 rounds per minute without complications. The 30-mm shell has twice the range, half the time to target, and three times the mass of projectiles fired by guns mounted in comparable close air support aircraft.

The muzzle velocity of the GAU-8/A is about the same as that of the M61 Vulcan cannon, but the GAU-8/A uses heavier ammunition and has superior ballistics. By comparison, the M61 has an 8-milliradian dispersion.

Recoil
Because the gun's recoil forces could push the entire plane off target during firing, the weapon is mounted laterally off-center, slightly to the port side of the fuselage centerline, with the active firing barrel lying directly on the aircraft's centerline. The firing barrel also lies just below the aircraft's center of gravity, being bore-sighted along a line 2 degrees below the aircraft's line of flight. This arrangement accurately centers the recoil forces, preventing changes in aircraft pitch or yaw when fired. This configuration also leaves space for the front landing gear, which is mounted slightly off-center on the starboard side of the nose.

The GAU-8/A utilizes recoil adapters. They are the interface between the gun housing and the gun mount. By absorbing (in compression) the recoil forces, they spread the time of the recoil impulse and counter recoil energy transmitted to the supporting structure when the gun is fired.

The A-10 engines were initially susceptible to flameout when subjected to gases generated in the firing of the gun. When the GAU-8 is being fired, the smoke from the gun can make the engines stop, and this did occur during initial flight testing. Gun exhaust is essentially oxygen-free, and is certainly capable of causing flameouts of gas turbines. The A-10 engines now have a self-sustaining combustion section. When the gun is fired, the igniters come on to reduce the possibility of a flameout.

The average recoil force of the GAU-8/A is 10,000 pounds-force (45 kN), which is slightly more than the output of each of the A-10's two TF34 engines of 9,065 lbf (40.3 kN).  While this recoil force is significant, in practice a cannon-fire burst slows the aircraft by only a few miles per hour in level flight.

Variants
Some of the GAU-8/A technology has been transferred into the smaller 25 mm GAU-12/U Equalizer, which was developed for the AV-8B Harrier II aircraft.  The GAU-12 is about the same size as the 20 mm M61. GE has also developed the GAU-13/A, a four-barreled weapon using GAU-8/A components, which has been tested in podded form as the GPU-5/A.  The Avenger also forms the basis for the Dutch-developed Goalkeeper CIWS naval air-defence gun. No current or contemplated aircraft other than the A-10 carries the full-up Avenger system.

Specifications

 Precision: 80% of rounds fired at  range hit within a  diameter circle.
 Ammo:
 PGU-14/B API Armor Piercing Incendiary (DU)
 PGU-13/B HEI High explosive incendiary
 PGU-15/B TP Target Practice
Armor penetration of Armor-Piercing Incendiary ammunition, BHN-300 RHA, attack angle 30 degrees from vertical:
 76 mm at 300 meters
 69 mm at 600 m
 64 mm at 800 m
 59 mm at 1,000 m
 55 mm at 1,220 m

See also
 Gryazev-Shipunov GSh-6-30
 List of aircraft weapons
 List of multiple-barrel firearms
 T249 Vigilante
 Type 730 CIWS

References

Bibliography
 Spick, Michael. The Great Book of Modern Warplanes, Salamander Books, 2000. .

External links

 General Electric GAU-8/A Avenger on USAF National Museum site
 GAU-8 Avenger, Hill Aerospace Museum, fas.org
 General Dynamics Ordnance and Tactical Systems GAU-8/A page
 Video of the GAU-8 Avenger test firing

Aircraft guns
Rotary cannon
Multi-barrel machine guns
30 mm artillery
Military equipment introduced in the 1970s
Cold War weapons of the United States